May Isabel Fisk (born Taylor, later Campbell-Johnston; May 22, 18721955) was an American monologist and writer. Known for her humor in her writing as well as performance, she was a contemporary and friend of Mark Twain, who called her "the only woman humorist in America". She lived in Britain for some years circa 1922 but returned to the United States in 1938.

Early life and education 
May Isabel Taylor was born on May 22, 1872, in New York City, to Isabelle (Gray) and William Willard Taylor. She attended the Sylvanus Reed school in New York and studied voice with a teacher named Toriani in Paris.

Career 
Fisk wrote "six books of comic monologues, two books of fiction, several plays, and numerous short stories". Her monologues generally concerned "society women" who did not treat those around them with respect. She wrote at least 60. Some were written in dialect. In addition to her written work, Fisk also performed on the vaudeville stage.

Critic Maggie B. Gale, comparing Fisk to Beatrice Herford, argues that both adopted an "anthropological perspective" on "social types" of the time.  Julia Hans argues that "Fisk expresses women's discontent through a mask of humor at a time when popular writers idealized feminine felicity and passivity".

According to Mark Twain, a friend of hers, Fisk was the "only woman humorist in America". She said she began writing humor because she didn't want to laugh alone. Fisk said, "Women are so funny because they take trivial things so seriously and because they are so unconsciously humorous".

Personal life 
May Taylor married Clinton Bowen Fisk on January 27, 1894. Her husband was the son of Clinton B. Fisk, who endowed Fisk University. Clinton Jr. worked as a newspaper editor and theatrical manager until his death in 1909. The couple had one child, Clinton B. Fisk, who later went by the name of Clinton Gray-Fisk, and became a music critic and animal rights activist. After Clinton Jr.'s death, May married Malcolm Campbell-Johnston on August 1, 1922, becoming a British national.

As of 1922, Fisk lived in London. She came back to the United States in 1938 after the death of her second husband, Malcolm Campbell-Johnston, and settled in California. In 1943, Fisk began working as a real estate developer of lots in Redondo Beach, California. She died in Paddington, London, in 1955.

Works 

 A Pair of Bellows (1897)
Monologues (1903)
 The Talking Woman (1907)
 The Eternal Feminine (1911)
 Monologues and Dialogues (1914)

Notes

References

Citations

Bibliography
 
 
 

1872 births
1955 deaths
19th-century American women writers
20th-century American women writers
19th-century American actresses
20th-century American actresses
American humorists
Monologists
Naturalised citizens of the United Kingdom